Charles Jervas (also Jarvis and Jervis; c. 1675 – 2 November 1739) was an Irish portrait painter, translator, and art collector of the early 18th century.

Early life 
Born in Shinrone, County Offaly, Ireland around 1675, the son of John Jervas and Elizabeth, daughter of Captain John Baldwin of Shinrone Castle & Corolanty, High Sheriff of County Offaly. Jervas studied in London, England as an assistant under Sir Godfrey Kneller between 1694 and 1695.

After selling a series of small copies of the Raphael Cartoons circa 1698 to Dr. George Clarke of All Souls College, Oxford, the following year he travelled to Paris and Rome (while financially supported by Clarke and others) remaining there for most of the decade before returning to London in 1709 where he found success as a portrait painter.

Career 

Painting portraits of the city's intellectuals, among them such personal friends as Jonathan Swift and the poet Alexander Pope (both now in the National Portrait Gallery, London), Charles Jervas became a popular artist often referred to in the works of literary figures of the period.

Jervas gave painting lessons to Pope at his house in Cleveland Court, St James's, which Pope mentions in his poem, To Belinda on the Rape of the Lock, written 1713, published 1717 in 'Poems on Several Occasions'.

Pope's verse Epistle to Mr Jervas, written circa 1715, was published in the 1716 edition of John Dryden's 1695 translation of Fresnoy's Art of Painting (Charles Alphonse Du Fresnoy's De arte graphica, 1668). In it, Pope refers to Jervas's skill as an artist:O, lasting as those colours may they shine,

Free as they stroke, yet faultless as thy line;

New graces yearly like thy works display,

Soft without weakness, without glaring gay!With his growing reputation, Jervas succeeded Kneller as Principal Painter in Ordinary to King George I in 1723, and subsequently King George II. In 1727 he married Penelope Hume, a wealthy widow with a supposed fortune of £20,000, and moved to Hampton, London.  He continued to live in London until his death in 1739.

His translation of Cervantes' novel Don Quixote, published posthumously in 1742 as being made by Charles "Jarvis" – because of a printer's error – has since come to be known as "the Jarvis translation". Jervas was first to provide an introduction to the novel including a critical analysis of previous translations of Don Quixote. It has been highly praised as the most accurate translation of the novel up to that time, but also strongly criticised for being stiff and humourless, although it went through many printings during the 19th century.

Legacy 
As principal portraitist to the King of England, Jervas was known for his vanity and luck, as mentioned in the Imperial Biographical Dictionary, "He married a widow with $20,000; and his natural self-conceit was greatly encouraged by his intimate friend [Alexander] Pope, who has written an epistle full of silly flattery." 

According to one account, after comparing a painting he had copied from Titian, he was said to have stated "Poor little Tit, how he would starve !".

Upon being told that Jervas had set up a carriage with four horses, Kneller replied: "Ach, mein Gott, if his horses do not draw better than he does, he will never get to his journey's end."

Notes

References 
 Webb, Alfred. A Compendium of Irish Biography: Comprising Sketches of Distinguished Irishmen and of Eminent Persons Connected with Ireland by Office or by Their Writings, New York: Lemma Publishing Corporation, 1970.

External links

 Grove Dictionary of Art: Charles Jervas
 The Twickenham Museum: Charles Jervas
 AbsoluteArts.com – Charles Jervas (1675–1739)
 National Portrait Gallery – Charles Jervas
 UK Government Art Collection – Charles Jervas 
 Dictionary of Irish Biography -- Charles Jervas 

1675 births
1739 deaths
17th-century Irish painters
18th-century Irish painters
Irish male painters
Irish portrait painters
People from County Offaly
Spanish–English translators
Irish translators
Translators of Miguel de Cervantes